Partulina confusa is a species of tropical air-breathing land snail, a terrestrial pulmonate gastropod mollusk in the family Achatinellidae. This species is endemic to Hawaii, in the United States.

References 

Molluscs of Hawaii
Partulina
Gastropods described in 1900
Taxonomy articles created by Polbot